The North Caledonian Cup, originally known as the North of Scotland Junior Cup and later the North of Scotland 2nd XI Cup is an annual association football cup for competition between football clubs across the Highlands & Islands of Scotland. 

The cup is a registered Scottish FA competition which runs under the auspices of the North Caledonian FA.

Origins 
First introduced during the 1887-88 season as the flagship competition of the Inverness Junior Football Association, the North Caledonian Cup was initially known as the North of Scotland Junior FA Cup, introduced as an association football cup for competition between juniors clubs from Inverness and the surrounding districts across the North of Scotland. 

In the season that followed, the Inverness Junior FA became known as the North of Scotland Junior FA and the cup would become its marquee competition 

The first competition was competed for between eighteen teams across the North of Scotland and was won in its first season by Inverness based junior club Crusaders F.C.

History 
In its infancy, much like the Highland Football League, cup entrants were mostly teams from the Inverness area and its surrounding districts and for the latter part of the 19th century the competition was dominated by the 2nd XI combinations entered by senior clubs. 

It was not until the 1902 that the trophy eventually left Inverness when Dingwall Victoria United - who would later become known as Ross County - won the trophy two years in succession. 

While reserve clubs were still a dominant force, the growth of junior clubs eventually led to teams from Tain, Grantown-on-spey and Muir of Ord adding their name to the trophy.

When the North of Scotland Junior FA dropped its junior status in 1935, the competition became known as the North of Scotland 2nd XI Cup.

By the late 1960s, a surge in the formation of senior clubs throughout Ross-shire, Sutherland and Caithness resulted in a break-up in the dominance of Highland Football League "2nd XI" sides. 

In 1984, the association took the decision to rename the association again in a bid to "shake off" the reserve football stigma which had been attached to the cup since its introduction 97 years prior and the trophy became known as the North Caledonian Cup. Since 1972, only six senior reserve teams have won the trophy, the last being Inverness Caledonian Thistle 'A' in 1998-99.

In 2008, the original trophy was retired due to being in a state of poor repair and was sent to Hampden for safe keeping and refurbishment.  Though the competition's lineage remained intact, a new trophy was introduced to replace the original. 

At the same time, the cup was briefly recognized and referred to as the Jock Mackay Memorial Cup before the competitions became two separate cups.

Past winners

Performance by club

References

Football in Scotland